Easan ( - The Lord Shiva) is a 2010 Indian Tamil-language drama film written, directed and produced by Sasikumar, directing his second film after the blockbuster, Subramaniapuram. It stars Samuthirakani, Vaibhav, producer A. L. Alagappan, and Abhinaya in lead roles alongside several newcomers. The film was known and referred to as Nagaram and Aaga Chiranthavan before the official title was confirmed.

The music was composed by James Vasanthan with cinematography by S. R. Kathir and editing by A. L. Ramesh. It wasreleased on 17 December 2010.

Plot
The story begins with a pub dance where girls and boys enjoy themselves to the fullest in a much spoilt way, which leads to verbal eve-teasing and results in a girl's death. Sangayya IPS, the Assistant Commissioner of Police (ACP) of the area, is forced to revoke the case because of Chezhian's influence. Chezhian, with his rich and corrupt father MLA Deivanayagam, the State Minister for Forests and Agriculture, would bail them out even if Chezhian and his friends commit multiple murders. Chezhian falls in love with a girl named Reshma, the daughter of a Karnataka-based businessman (largely inspired by Vijay Mallya).

There are some political dramas that happen before the families agree to their marriage. Sangayya has been used in this political drama. He gets furious after learning this, but his hands are tied by the police commissioner. When Chezhian is mysteriously kidnapped and beaten up by an unknown character, Sangayya starts an unofficial investigation upon the commissioner's request. Sangayya solves the case and discovers that an 11th grade student named Easan is responsible.

Easan has a flashback sequence. His father was a government employee in their native village, where he and his mute sister Poorani did their schooling. Once Poorani finished school, they moved to Chennai so that she can pursue fashion technology. Poorani's classmates are all too rich and spoiled. She is taken by one of her classmates to a party, where she is raped by Chezhian and his friend Vinod multiple times. Easan's family, not being able to cope with the incident, commits suicide by drinking poisoned coffee, but Easan survived because he only drank a bit. Easan is rushed to the emergency, where Poorani's friend Shyamala visits him and reveals what happened to his sister. Due to the strong affection that he has for his sister, he decides to take revenge over the convicts.

Easan is a computer tech genius and uses this to change the online prescription of Vinoth, so that he is killed as a medical accident. He has also kidnapped and beaten the hell out of Chezhian. This is revealed to Sangayya by Easan himself, while Deivanayagam and his assistant arrive at the scene of investigation and find Chezhian's dead body. Deivanayagam and his assistant attack Sangayya and attempt to kill Easan by setting him on fire. Sangayya saves Easan and himself from Deivanayagam and his assistant by shooting and killing them. Easan is finally admitted in a juvenile reformatory and is visited by Sangayya and his family.

Cast
 Samuthirakani as ACP Sangayya
 Vaibhav as Chezhian Deivanayagam
 A. L. Alagappan as MLA Deivanayagam
 Abhinaya as Poorani
 Aparnaa Bajpai as Reshma Shivaraj
 Dushyanth Jayaprakash as Easan
 Rao Ramesh as Neethirajan
 Blessy as Karupusamy
 Namo Narayana as Gopal
 Niranjan Jayaprakash as Vinod
 Thulasi as Shyamala
 Latha Rao
 Dinesh (cameo appearance in the song "Jilla Vittu")

Production
Actor Vikram announced his own production company Reel Life Entertainment in July 2009 and announced that Sasikumar would direct his first film, Easan, featuring Samuthirakani, Vaibhav, Abhinaya, and Aparnaa Bajpai. However, after 90% of the shoot had been completed, Vikram pulled out of the venture, citing that Sasikumar had overshot his budget and the director eventually bought and released the film. Dushyanth and Niranjan, the two sons of actor Jayaprakash (of Pasanga fame), made their acting debuts.

Soundtrack
Easans soundtrack is composed by James Vasanthan, with whom Sasikumar had worked for Subramaniapuram as well. The audio launch event was held on 19 November 2010 at Sathyam Cinemas, Chennai, with noted and acclaimed directors from various Indian film industries - K.Balachander, Bala and Ameer Sultan from the Tamil film industry along with Bollywood director Anurag Kashyap, Malayalam director Ranjith, Telugu director Trivikram Srinivas and Kannada director Yograj Bhat - participating.

Reception
Times of India wrote "Though "Eesan" is not in the class of "Subramaniapuram", it is a very satisfying watch nonetheless". Rediff wrote "If the director had shored up the second half just as much he's worked on the first, Eesan would have been a brilliant effort all over. As it stands, it's worth a watch, but doesn't really match up to Subramaniapuram". Sify wrote "The basic plot of Easan is simple, predictable and even cliched but it is that presentation and performances of all characters big and small that makes the film watchable". Behindwoods wrote "Through Easan, Sasikumar has attempted to convey the dangers of city life when not dealt with carefully and it could also ring in a warning to people who take things lightly. [..] If Sasi has pruned some of the sequences, Easan would have been a riveting offering".

References

External links
 

2010 films
2010 thriller drama films
2010s Tamil-language films
Indian thriller drama films
Films set in Chennai
Films shot in Chennai
Films scored by James Vasanthan
Fictional portrayals of the Tamil Nadu Police
Films about rape in India
2010 drama films